Zuidplein is an above-ground metro station in the south of the city of Rotterdam, Netherlands. It is part of Rotterdam Metro lines D and E.

The station opened on 9 February 1968, on the same date that the North-South Line (also formerly called Erasmus line), of which it is a part, was opened. It served as the southern terminus of the line until 25 November 1970, when a one-station extension to Slinge was opened.

Zuidplein station is located immediately adjacent to a large shopping centre of the same name. Rotterdam Ahoy, a large indoor arena, is also within walking distance of the station. A bus station is located directly underneath the metro station, providing access to local bus services.

Rotterdam Metro stations
RandstadRail stations in Rotterdam
Railway stations opened in 1968
1968 establishments in the Netherlands
Railway stations in the Netherlands opened in the 20th century
Railway stations in the Netherlands opened in the 1960s